Officer Geomancer is a TVB comedy detective drama produced by Nelson Cheung, starring Johnson Lee and Joey Meng.

Synopsis
Sit Dan Yan (Johnson Lee) is not an ordinary police constable. He is an expert in geomancy, which he uses at critical moments to solve mysterious cases. He also has Leung Sing Kau (Oscar Leung), who is connected with people conducting both legal and illegal activities, as his informant. His outlandish character often leaves his superior, Che Gwai Fei (Joey Meng), astonished. She is a criminal psychologist who uses rationale to analyze everything. They appear to be polar opposites, yet through working together, they develop an unspoken mutual understanding. Outside of work, she only cares about the marriages of her younger siblings, Che Gwai Yan (Harriet Yeung) and Che Gwai Gwan (Frederick Cheng). When Che Gwai Mei becomes involved in a love triangle with Leung Sing Kau and Tit Leung Chi (Rebecca Zhu), Che Gwai Mei loses control of her emotions. Luckily, Sit Dan Yan is there to help. At this time, a series of missing persons cases occur. The culprit's modus operandi evokes Sit Dan Yan's memories of the past, which he has been hiding for many years.

Cast and Characters

Development
Bobby Au-yeung was originally cast as the main lead, but due to a schedule conflict, second lead Johnson Lee replaced him. Lee's original role was replaced by Oscar Leung

Viewership Ratings

Awards and nominations

International broadcast
  - 8TV (Malaysia)

References

External links

TVB dramas
Hong Kong drama television series
Television series set in the 2010s
2014 Hong Kong television series debuts
2015 Hong Kong television series endings